Puya lasiopoda is a species in the genus Puya. This species is native to Bolivia.

References

lasiopoda
Flora of Bolivia